East Greenwich Historic District is a historic district encompassing the historic commercial and civic heart of East Greenwich, Rhode Island, United States.  The district bounded on the east by Greenwich Cove, an inlet on Narrangansett Bay, on the south by London and Spring Streets, on the west roughly by Park Street, and on the north by Division Street.  The district extends westward on Division Street as far Dark Entry Brook, and the district properties on its north side now lie in the city of Warwick.  East Greenwich was settled in 1677 with its town center growing in the district, with a rural farm landscape to the west.  The area's road network had begun to take shape by the mid-18th century, and the town center was industrialized in the 19th century.

The district was listed on the National Register of Historic Places in 1974.  It includes several separately-listed properties: the Windmill Cottage at 144 Division Street, the Kent County Courthouse, the Gen. James Mitchell Varnum House, the Armory of the Kentish Guards, and the Col. Micah Whitmarsh House.

See also
National Register of Historic Places listings in Kent County, Rhode Island
Manor of East Greenwich

References

External links

Historic districts in Kent County, Rhode Island
Warwick, Rhode Island
East Greenwich, Rhode Island
Historic American Buildings Survey in Rhode Island
Historic districts on the National Register of Historic Places in Rhode Island
National Register of Historic Places in Kent County, Rhode Island
1677 establishments in Rhode Island